This is a list of members of the Victorian Legislative Assembly from 1950 to 1952, as elected at the 1950 state election and subsequent by-elections:

  On 18 December 1950, the Liberal member for Ivanhoe, Rupert Curnow, died. Liberal candidate Frank Block won the resulting by-election on 24 February 1951.
  In March 1951, the Labor member for Prahran, Frank Crean, resigned to stand for Division of Melbourne Ports at the 1951 federal election. Labor candidate Robert Pettiona won the resulting by-election on 16 June 1951.
  On 19 January 1952, the Labor member for Port Melbourne, Tom Corrigan, died. His son, Stan Corrigan won the resulting by-election for Labor on 13 September 1952.
  In July 1952, the Liberal member for Toorak, Edward Reynolds, resigned. Liberal candidate Horace Petty won the resulting by-election on 13 September 1952.
  In September 1952, former Premier Thomas Hollway was expelled from the Liberal Party. He managed to form a short-lived ministry in October consisting entirely of his supporters; this ministry's defeat was the catalyst for the December 1952 election at which three of his five parliamentary supporters retained their seats and Hollway himself won the seat of Glen Iris from the Liberal leader, Les Norman.

Sources
 Re-member (a database of all Victorian MPs since 1851). Parliament of Victoria.

Members of the Parliament of Victoria by term
20th-century Australian politicians